Kolpachki is a rural locality (a khutor) in Primorskoye Rural Settlement, Kalachyovsky District, Volgograd Oblast, Russia. The population was 352 as of 2010. There are 19 streets.

Geography 
Kolpachki is located 45 km southeast of Kalach-na-Donu (the district's administrative centre) by road. Pyatimorsk is the nearest rural locality.

References 

Rural localities in Kalachyovsky District